Bušanovice is a municipality and village in Prachatice District in the South Bohemian Region of the Czech Republic. It has about 300 inhabitants.

Administrative parts
Villages of Beneda, Dolní Nakvasovice, Horní Nakvasovice and Želibořice are administrative parts of Bušanovice.

Geography
It lies in the Bohemian Forest Foothills.

History
The first written mention of Bušanovice is from 1314. It was founded as one of the old free royal settlements in the area. In 1490 it was first listed as part of the Hluboká estate. In 1552, it was acquired by William of Rosenberg.

Notable people
Jakub Bursa (1813–1884), architect

References

External links

Villages in Prachatice District